Aphera lindae is a species of sea snail, a marine gastropod mollusk in the family Cancellariidae, the nutmeg snails.

Description
Original description: "Shell solid, thickened, oval-elliptical in shape, shiny; entire shell surface covered with numerous fine axial ribs and numerous fine spiral cords; axial ribs and spiral cords of equal size, intersecting to produce finely cancellate sculpture; columella wide, reflected onto body whorl as polished enameled area; columella with 2 large, equal-sized plications; edge of lip crenulated; interior of aperture with 15 lirae which disappear farther inside; color pure white with single large pale tan patch on dorsum; interior of aperture and columella white."

Distribution
Locus typicus: "Golfo de Triste, off Puerto Cabello, Venezuela."

References

Cancellariidae
Gastropods described in 1987